Austrocarea iocephala is a moth of the family Nolidae. It is found in New South Wales and Norfolk Island.

The moths can be found on the tree Ungeria floribunda on Norfolk Island.

References

External links
Australian Faunal Directory
Australian Insects

Moths of Australia
Chloephorinae
Moths described in 1902